Cyprus is an island country in West Asia, geopolitically apart of Southern Europe, in the east Mediterranean, officially known as the Republic of Cyprus.

Cyprus may also refer to:

Places
 British Cyprus (1878–1960)
 Cyprus (European Parliament constituency), created in 2004
 Cyprus (island), the island that contains the Republic of Cyprus and self-declared Northern Cyprus
 Cyprus, London, an area of London, United Kingdom, named after the island
 Kingdom of Cyprus (1192–1489)
 Roman Cyprus, a small senatorial province within the Roman Empire

Transportation
 Cyprus (ship), three merchant ships
 Cyprus Airways, from 2017, the current flag carrier airline of Cyprus
 Cyprus Airways (1947–2015), the former flag carrier airline of Cyprus
 Cyprus DLR station, a metropolitan transport station serving the area of Cyprus, London (see above)
 45605 Cyprus, a British LMS Jubilee Class locomotive

Other uses
 Cyprus (domino game)
 Cyprus (wine)
 Tabby cat, once known as Cyprus cat in England

See also
 Northern Cyprus, a self-declared state
 Cypres, an automatic activation device for parachuting
 Cy-près doctrine, an equitable legal doctrine dealing with charitable trusts
 Cypress (disambiguation)
 Cypris (disambiguation)